= Kharpa, Bhopal =

Kharpa
- village
- Location within Madhya Pradesh Location within India
- Coordinates: 23.174605°N 77.276429°E
- Country: India
- State: Madhya Pradesh
- District: Bhopal
- Tehsil: Huzur

Population (2011)
  - Total: 712
- Time zone: UTC+5:30 (IST)
- ISO 3166 code: MP-IN
- Census code: 482508

Kharpa is a village in the Bhopal district of Madhya Pradesh, India. It is located in the Huzur tehsil and the Phanda block.

== Demographics ==
According to the 2011 census of India, Kharpa has 176 households. The effective literacy rate (i.e. the literacy rate of population excluding children aged 6 and below) is 76.81%.

Demographics (2011 Census)
| | Total | Male | Female |
|---|---|---|---|
| Population | 712 | 376 | 336 |
| Children aged below 6 years | 104 | 58 | 46 |
| Scheduled caste | 108 | 51 | 57 |
| Scheduled tribe | 4 | 3 | 1 |
| Literates | 467 | 278 | 189 |
| Workers (all) | 388 | 202 | 186 |
| Main workers (total) | 234 | 198 | 36 |
| Main workers: Cultivators | 162 | 142 | 20 |
| Main workers: Agricultural labourers | 40 | 29 | 11 |
| Main workers: Household industry workers | 8 | 6 | 2 |
| Main workers: Other | 24 | 21 | 3 |
| Marginal workers (total) | 154 | 4 | 150 |
| Marginal workers: Cultivators | 81 | 2 | 79 |
| Marginal workers: Agricultural labourers | 68 | 1 | 67 |
| Marginal workers: Household industry workers | 1 | 0 | 1 |
| Marginal workers: Others | 4 | 1 | 3 |
| Non-workers | 324 | 174 | 150 |
